The World Games I women's water polo competition was held on July 25–27, 1981, at Santa Clara International Swim Center in Santa Clara, California. Teams from the United States (2), Netherlands and Canada participated. Six days before the first game, Canada had become the newly-crowned World Cup champion in Brisbane, Australia, in a competition that included the same three teams that medaled in these Games.

Medalists

Standing

Details
Saturday, July 25, 1981:

United States I 14, United States II 4Netherlands 17, Canada 7

Sunday, July 26, 1981:

United States I 9, Canada 6Netherlands 22, United States II 3

Monday, July 27, 1981:

Netherlands 13, United States I 7Canada 11, United States II 3

Other known individual participants:  USA – Marybeth Rozance

References

1981
1981 World Games
1981 in water polo